The 2008 VMI Keydets football team represented the Virginia Military Institute during the 2008 NCAA Division I FCS football season. It was the Keydets 118th year of football, which began in 1891, and their 6th season in the Big South Conference. VMI was run by first year head coach Sparky Woods, who was previously a head coach at Appalachian State and South Carolina. Woods was a replacement for his predecessor Jim Reid, who departed from the Institute to be linebackers coach of the Miami Dolphins.

The Keydets enjoyed one of their most successful seasons in recent years in terms of wins. The year started with a convincing victory over St. Francis 49–0. After a 52–17 drubbing from William & Mary, the Keydets handled another Division-II opponent, 69–20. A late second-half surge then pushed Ohio past VMI 51–31 the following week. Another large loss came from Richmond at home, 56–16. The Keydets did, however, get their first conference win since 2005, a 47–20 blowout victory over Coastal Carolina. VMI ended the year with a 49–27 win over future conference member Presbyterian, breaking a four-game losing streak.

Schedule

References

VMI
VMI Keydets football seasons
VMI Keydets football